PBI can refer to:

Classifications 
 Predominantly Black Institution, a college or university that is not technically an HBCU, but primarily serves African Americans

Organizations
 the ICAO code of Pacific Blue Airlines
 the IATA airport code of Palm Beach International Airport in West Palm Beach, Florida
 Pan Britannica Industries
 Labour Party of Indonesia (Indonesian: Partai Buruh Indonesia), a political party in Indonesia.
 Pastoral Bible Institute
 Peace Brigades International, a non-governmental organization founded in 1981
 Pitney Bowes Inc.'s stock ticker symbol
 Prairie Bible Institute, a Bible college near Three Hills, Alberta
 Polar Bears International
 Public Benevolent Institution, a type of charity in Australia
 Police Bureau of Investigation, a specialized unit of the Bangladesh Police

Science
 Phenylbenzimidazole, a common sunscreen ingredient
 Polybenzimidazole fiber
 Perylene-3,4:9,10-tetracarboxylic acid bisimide, also perylene bisimide or perylene diimide (PDI)

Technology
 Parallel Bus Interface, a 50-pin port found on some Atari 8-bit XL computers
 PBI Regional Medical Center, a hospital in Passaic, New Jersey
 , a computer filename extension used on by the TrueOS operating system
 Problem Investigation, by PT Inovação
 Product backlog item, a term used in the Scrum variant of the Agile methodology used for software development
 Power BI, a business intelligence platform by Microsoft, used for reporting and dashboards

Other
 Poor Bloody Infantry, a military slang term.
Partial basic income, a basic income set at a level that is less than enough to meet a person's basic needs